"Put Your Arms Around Me" is a song by Scottish alternative rock band Texas, released on 3 November 1997 as the fourth single from their fourth studio album, White on Blonde (1997). The song peaked at number 10 on the UK Singles Chart. The Autumn Breeze mix, which was the version released as a single, was included on the soundtrack to Ever After: A Cinderella Story.

Critical reception
British magazine Music Week rated "Put Your Arms Around Me" four out of five, adding, "Sharleen Spiteri's voice has rarely sounded better than on this re-recorded version of the White On Blonde ballad which is likely to be championed on Chris Evans' Virgin Radio Breakfast Show."

Track listings
 UK CD1 
 "Put Your Arms Around Me" (Autumn Breeze mix) – 4:28
 "Never Never" – 3:45
 "You're All I Need to Get By" (Mary Ann Hobbs session) – 4:08
 "Put Your Arms Around Me" (Ambient mix) – 5:30

 UK CD2 
 "Put Your Arms Around Me" (Autumn Breeze mix) – 4:28
 "Put Your Arms Around Me" (Breath mix) – 8:35
 "Put Your Arms Around Me" (Spooky Soul mix) – 5:06
 "Put Your Arms Around Me" (Shimmering Sun mix) – 5:34
 "Put Your Arms Around Me" (Electric for Bird mix) – 5:31
 "Put Your Arms Around Me" (Spooky Dub mix) – 5:48
Note: Limited edition with four postcards.

 UK cassette single 
 "Put Your Arms Around Me" (Autumn Breeze mix) – 4:28
 "You're All I Need to Get By" (Mary Ann Hobbs session) – 4:08

Personnel
Personnel are lifted from The Greatest Hits album booklet.

 Texas – production
 Johnny McElhone – writing, keyboards, programming
 Sharleen Spiteri – writing, programming
 Ally McErlaine – guitars
 Eddie Campbell – keyboards, programming
 Richard Hynd – programming
 Dave Stewart – writing, guitars, production
 Robert Hodgens – writing
 Alex Silva – additional programming and keyboards
 Terry Disley – additional programming and keyboards
 Ash Howes – mix engineering

Charts

References

1997 singles
Texas (band) songs
Songs written by Johnny McElhone
Songs written by Sharleen Spiteri
Songs written by David A. Stewart

fr:Put Your Arms Around Me